Laurent Madou Zahui (10 August 1960 – 16 March 2021) was an Ivorian professional footballer who played as a defender for Stade d'Abidjan, AS Angoulême, Rodez, and the Ivory Coast national team.

Club career
Born in Gagnoa, Zahui began playing football in the local league for Stade d'Abidjan.

Zahui signed professional contracts with French league sides AS Angoulême and Rodez AF.

International career
Zahui made several appearances for the Ivory Coast national team and played at the 1988 finals.

He also played for Ivory Coast at the 1977 FIFA World Youth Championship finals in Tunisia.

Death
Zahui died on 16 March 2021 in Toulouse, while undergoing hip surgery.

References

External links
 
 

1960 births
2021 deaths
People from Gagnoa
Ivorian footballers
Association football defenders
Ivory Coast international footballers
1980 African Cup of Nations players
1986 African Cup of Nations players
1988 African Cup of Nations players
Stade d'Abidjan players
Angoulême Charente FC players
Rodez AF players